Jammie Jamieson is a United States Air Force officer and the first operational female fighter pilot selected to fly the Lockheed Martin F-22 Raptor. Her call sign is "Trix".

Career

She was born in Tacoma and lived in Prosser from 1982 until she left for the Air Force Academy in 1996. After receiving her commission through the academy in 2000 and a master's degree in public policy in national security and political economy from the John F. Kennedy School of Government at Harvard University in 2002, Jamieson completed the F-15C Basic Course at Tyndall AFB. After three years flying the F-15C in Alaska, she completed the F-22A Transition Qualification Course at Tyndall in 2008. She also served as a glider trainer.

News and media

She attended as a guest speaker in the air force TV Report that featured a story on American and Iraqi women celebrating Women's Equality Day together on 11 September 2009.

Family 
Jamieson is a mother of three.

References

Year of birth missing (living people)
Living people
United States Air Force officers
Women in the United States Air Force
Articles containing video clips
United States Air Force Academy alumni
Harvard Kennedy School alumni